North Shore Hospital is a large public hospital in Takapuna, New Zealand, serving the northern part of Auckland. Located on Shakespeare Road near Lake Pupuke, it is administered by the Waitemata District Health Board, which provides health services to approximately 600,000 residents of the North Shore, Waitakere and Rodney districts of Auckland. Emergency Department staff at North Shore see more than 46,000 cases each year.

Facilities
The hospital provides up to 600 surgical and general medical treatment beds. It has twelve  operating theatres (one specialised in obstetric care), an emergency department, a 50-bed Assessment and Diagnostic Unit, an intensive care centre, an Elective Surgery Centre and a coronary care, as well as a maternity and special care baby unit.

The hospital also provides endoscopy, radiology, pathology, anaesthetic, gynecological, general surgery, a cardiac catheter lab and mental health services through the onsite Marinoto and He Puna Waiora units. Visiting specialists cover a number of further medical sub-disciplines. Two of the wards specialise in assessment, treatment and rehabilitation of older patients over 65 years of age.

Funding and staffing
In 2007, North Shore Hospital repeatedly reported 100% occupancy rates and difficulties in finding enough staff. This is alleged to be partly due to North Shore City's affluence, with the catchment area having some of the highest average incomes in New Zealand, as well as scoring high on other social indicators. As the District Health Board funding scheme distributes money based on these indicators, it has been claimed that it receives much less funding per population served than hospitals in other areas of the country.

The issues with staff shortages and overcrowding, repeatedly discussed in the press during the middle of 2007, have led two North Shore National MPs to inquire into the issue, noting that a 'crisis of confidence' had developed, which was generating more concern from locals 'than anything else in recent times'.

In 2011 North Shore Hospital opened an Assessment and Diagnostic Unit (ADU) designed to improve overcrowding and patient flow through the North Shore Emergency Department, and increase inpatient bed capacity. Waitemata DHB has since made improvements against the NZ Ministry of Health's Shorter Stays in ED target. From July to September 2009 61% of patients were admitted, discharged or transferred from an emergency department within six hours.  For the same period in 2013, 95% of patients were admitted, discharged or transferred within six hours.

References

External links
Photographs of North Shore Hospital held in Auckland Libraries' heritage collections.

1958 establishments in New Zealand
Buildings and structures in Auckland
North Shore, New Zealand
Teaching hospitals in New Zealand
Hospitals established in 1958
Maternity hospitals
Maternity in New Zealand